Trichomonasvirus is a genus of viruses, in the family Totiviridae. The protozoan parasite Trichomonas vaginalis serves as the natural host. There are four species in this genus.

Taxonomy
The following four species are assigned to the genus:
 Trichomonas vaginalis virus 1
 Trichomonas vaginalis virus 2
 Trichomonas vaginalis virus 3
 Trichomonas vaginalis virus 4

Structure
Viruses in Trichomonasvirus are non-enveloped, with icosahedral geometries, and T=2 symmetry. The diameter is around 36 nm. Genomes are linear and non-segmented, around 4.6-4.9kb in length. The genome has 2 open reading frames.

Life cycle
Viral replication is cytoplasmic. Entry into the host cell is achieved by attachment to host receptors, which mediates endocytosis. Replication follows the double-stranded RNA virus replication model. Double-stranded RNA virus transcription is the method of transcription. Protozoan parasite trichomonas vaginalis serve as the natural host.

References

External links
 Viralzone: Trichomonasvirus
 ICTV

Totiviridae
Virus genera